Neil Andrew Carter (born 11 May 1958) is an English musician who has worked in diverse genres throughout his career. Classically trained, he became a professional rock musician at the age of 17 and initially had his first "mainstream" experience with singer-songwriter Gilbert O'Sullivan. He subsequently played guitar and keyboard for the hard rock band UFO, blues rock guitarist Gary Moore, and Wild Horses. He is credited for co-writing a number of Gary Moore's songs including the worldwide hit "Empty Rooms". At 30 he left the rock world and  developed a different career as both teacher of woodwind (saxophone and clarinet) and as an ABRSM examiner. 2010 saw an unexpected return to rock with Gary Moore, playing festivals across Europe and a tour of Ukraine and Russia. Future tours and a Celtic rock album were to follow but this was curtailed by the death of Gary Moore in February 2011.

On 30 April 2019, it was announced that he would return to UFO for their 'Last Orders' tour, following the death of Paul Raymond with Carter replacing Raymond. The tour began in June 2019 in Germany and continued into 2022 after being postponed from 2020 due to the COVID 19 pandemic.

Brighton College career
Carter taught at Brighton College, from January 1993 holding the position of "Head of Woodwind and Brass". He taught one-on-one lessons on clarinet and saxophone. Carter was the conductor of the school Concert Band, and the school Saxophone Ensemble and led the School's Swing Band. Carter left Brighton College in June 2014 to move down to his home in Lanzarote. He will continue his work as an examiner for ABRSM.

Discography

With UFO
1981 The Wild, the Willing and the Innocent
1982 Mechanix
1983 Making Contact
1983  Headstone - live album

With Wild Horses
1980 Wild Horses

With Gary Moore
1983 Victims of the Future
1984 We Want Moore!
1985 Run for Cover
1987 Wild Frontier
1989 After the War
2010 Live at Montreux 2010

See also
 Brighton College
 UFO
 Gary Moore

References

External links

 Brighton College Official Website
 The Neil Carter Homepage

1958 births
Living people
English rock guitarists
English rock keyboardists
UFO (band) members
The Gary Moore Band members
Wild Horses (British band) members